Broken Island may refer to one of the following:

Broken Island (Antarctica)
Broken Island, Falkland Islands
Broken Island (Seattle)